Micaelsen is a surname. Notable people with the surname include:

Frank Stubb Micaelsen (1947–2013), Norwegian schoolteacher, poet, and novelist
Torgeir Micaelsen (born 1979), Norwegian politician
Vera Micaelsen (1974–2018), Norwegian television journalist and author

See also
Michaelsen